Rob Nijjar (born 1967) is a Canadian Liberal politician. He has lived all his life on Vancouver's East side.   He attended school in southeast Vancouver and Langara College before attending Simon Fraser University, where he earned a Bachelor's degree in General Studies in 1992. After graduation and before becoming active in politics, Nijjar worked as a business manager for several firms including Jenny Craig, some family-run restaurants, and other service industry businesses.  Nijjar worked at various levels of government, including municipal, provincial, and federal politics.

Nijjar was first elected to the BC Legislature in the 2001 provincial election as a Liberal. Nijjar was the chair of the Government Caucus Committee on the Economy.  At one time he was also sat on the Legislative Standing Committee for Education and chaired the Sub-Committee on Youth Employment.

Nijjar was defeated in the provincial election of 2005 by Adrian Dix.

Election results

References

1967 births
Living people
British Columbia Liberal Party MLAs
Canadian politicians of Indian descent
Politicians from Vancouver
Simon Fraser University alumni
21st-century Canadian politicians
Langara College people